This is a list of newspapers in the Dominican Republic.
 theAdscene.com (North Coast, Cabarete, Sosua, Puerto Plata)
 Camino – weekly religious newspaper
 El Caribe (Santo Domingo)
 Clave (Santo Domingo) -  free weekly newspaper
 El Día (Santo Domingo) – free newspaper
 Diario a Diario (Santo Domingo) – weekly newspaper
 Diario Libre (Santo Domingo) – free newspaper
 Dominican Today
 DominicanCentral.com (North Coast, Cabarete, Sosua, Puerto Plata)
 DominicanoDigital.com (Santo Domingo) - multilingual newspaper
 DominicanosHoy.com (Santo Domingo)
 El Expresso (Santo Domingo) – free daily newspaper; defunct
 El Faro (Puerto Plata)
 Hoy (Santo Domingo)
 La Información (Santiago)
 El Jaya (San Francisco de Macoris)
 Listín Diario (Santo Domingo) – oldest newspaper in the Dominican Republic
 La Nación (Santo Domingo) – defunct
 El Nacional (Santo Domingo) – afternoon newspaper
 La Noticia (Santo Domingo) – defunct
 Nuevo Diario (Santo Domingo)
 Primicias (Santo Domingo) – weekly newspaper
 El Siglo 1989–2002 (Santo Domingo) – defunct
 El Sol (Santo Domingo) – defunct
 Última Hora (Santo Domingo) – defunct
 Metro RD (Santo Domingo)

See also
 List of newspapers

Further reading

External links
 

Dominican Republic
Newspapers